The Anjan-class tugboats are a series of service watercraft built by Goa Shipyard Limited, earlier part of Mazagon Dock Limited, for the Indian navy.

Boats in the class

See also

References

Ships of the Indian Navy
Auxiliary ships of the Indian Navy
Tugs of the Indian Navy